Stroud Green is a suburb of London, England.

Stroud Green may also refer to the following places in England:

 Stroud Green, Berkshire
 Stroud Green, Essex
 Stroud Green, Gloucestershire